Lichtenfels may refer to:

Places
 Lichtenfels, Hesse in Germany
 Lichtenfels, Bavaria in Germany
 Lichtenfels station
 1. FC Lichtenfels, a German association football club
 Lichtenfels (district) in Bavaria
 Lichtenfels, Greenland, a former settlement

People with the surname
 Friedrich-Karl Freiherr von Dalwigk zu Lichtenfels (1907–1940),  German Major in the Luftwaffe during World War II
 Julius Lichtenfels (1884–1968), German fencer
 Eduard Peithner von Lichtenfels (1833–1913), Austrian painter
 Friedrich Wilhelm Scanzoni von Lichtenfels (1821–1891), German gynecologist and obstetrician
  (1885-1977), grandson of Friedrich Wilhelm Scanzoni von Lichtenfels
 Gustav Scanzoni von Lichtenfels (1855–1924), German general of World War I

Ships
 SS Lichtenfels (1929), a heavy lift ship, built for the DDG Hansa shipping company

German-language surnames